Bíldudalur Airport  is an airport serving Bíldudalur, a village in the Vesturbyggð municipality in the Westfjords of Iceland.

Airlines and destinations

Statistics

Passengers and movements

See also 
 Transport in Iceland
 List of airports in Iceland

Notes

References

External links 
 OurAirports - Bíldudalur
 OpenStreetMap - Bíldudalur

Airports in Iceland